The Niangua River  is a  tributary of the Osage River in the Ozarks region of southern and central Missouri in the United States.  Via the Osage and Missouri rivers it is part of the watershed of the Mississippi River.

Niangua River has the name of Niangua (or Nehemgar), an Indian tribal leader. The name is said to mean "bear".

Course
The Niangua River is formed in Webster County by the confluence of its short east and west forks, and flows generally northward through Dallas, Laclede and Camden counties, past Bennett Spring, Lake Niangua, and Ha Ha Tonka State Parks.  It flows into the Osage River as an arm of the Lake of the Ozarks, which is formed by the Bagnell Dam on the Osage.  As part of the lake it collects the Little Niangua River.

River accesses 
This is a list of areas where the Niangua River can be publicly accessed; this list was put in order from beginning of river to where river meets up with Lake of the Ozarks.
Bridal Cave
Charity Access- State-owned river access; no camping allowed.
Cline Ford
Hico Slab- Where a road crosses the river; the bridge is basically a low-lying concrete slab with water tunnels.
Del Marlin Ford
Deusenberry Creek
Gaunt Ford
Crane Ford
Route 32 Bridge
Big John Access- State-owned river access.
Wimberly Ford
Dallion Ford
Hackler Ford
Williams Ford Access- A one lane road crossing; crossing is a concrete slab where water flows over the top.
Hwy. K-P Bridge Access- Access includes privately owned campground, picnic area, and shuttle service.
Moon Valley Access- State-owned river access.
Hildebrand Ford
Cat Hollow- Privately owned campground and cabins nearby.
Route 64 Bridge
Bennett Spring Access- State-owned river access.
Barclay Springs- State-owned river access.
Gilbertson Ford
Prosperine Access- State-owned river access.
Mountain Creek- Access includes privately owned campground, picnic area, cabins and shuttle service.
McPheters Ford
Smith Ford
Leadmine Conservation Area- State-owned river access and conservation area; primitive camping allowed.
Lake Niangua- Includes access and picnic area; no camping allowed.
Whistle Bridge- Low-lying river crossing where road crosses river.
Stone Ford
Ha Ha Tonka State Park- State-owned river access; this is where the river merges into Lake of the Ozarks.
 banister ford north of Macks creek

See also
List of Missouri rivers

References

Columbia Gazetteer of North America entry
DeLorme (2002).  Missouri Atlas & Gazetteer.  Yarmouth, Maine: DeLorme.  .

Rivers of Missouri
Rivers of Camden County, Missouri
Rivers of Dallas County, Missouri
Rivers of Laclede County, Missouri
Rivers of Webster County, Missouri
Lake of the Ozarks
Tributaries of the Missouri River